John Stewart Sinclair (15 May 1853 – 30 April 1919) was a British clergyman who became Archdeacon of Cirencester.

Sinclair was the son of Prebendary William Sinclair, sometime Rector of Pulborough, Sussex; and the grandson of the Scottish politician and author Sir John Sinclair . He was educated at Repton School and Oriel College, Oxford, and ordained in 1876. After curacies in Pulborough and Fulham, he was vicar of St Dionis, Parsons Green, and then in Cirencester until his appointment as Archdeacon.

References

1853 births
1919 deaths
People educated at Repton School
Alumni of Oriel College, Oxford
Archdeacons of Cheltenham